Womanizer may refer to:

 "Womanizer" (term), a promiscuous heterosexual man
 "Womanizer" (song), a 2008 song by Britney Spears
 "Womanizer", a 1977 song by Blood, Sweat & Tears from Brand New Day
 Womanizer, a 2004 album by Absolute Steel
 "Womanizer", a 2009 song by Sliimy from Paint Your Face
The Womanizer, 1992 novella by Warren Adler
The Womanizer, 2002 novel by Rick Salutin